Robert Benjamin Greenblatt (1906-1987) was a Canadian physician and medical researcher specializing in endocrinology who spent almost all of his career at  the Medical College of Georgia (MCG); where he pioneered endocrinology as an independent discipline. He was especially known for his work in the development of the sequential oral contraceptive pill and the oral fertility pill.

Biography
Born in 1906 in Montreal, Canada, Greenblatt attended McGill University in Montreal, where he received his Bachelor of Arts degree in 1928 and his Doctor of Medicine and Master of Surgery degrees in 1932. In 1935, after completing his internship, he joined MCG as a research fellow in pathology and resident in obstetrics and gynecology. In 1937, he was appointed assistant professor of pathology and gynecology, and two years later, he was named professor of experimental medicine. Greenblatt went on to pioneer endocrinology as an independent discipline.

In his early years at MCG Greenblatt worked with Edgar Pund on the pathology and therapy of  granuloma inguinale, a widely endemic venereal disease. In 1943 he volunteered for military service and served as a Commander and Senior Medical Officer in the U.S. Coast Guard. His first assignment was to quell a venereal disease epidemic spreading among sailors in Savannah, Ga. He helped develop mass production of penicillin for battlefield use; commanded a triage unit on the Okinawa beachhead for wounded Marines; and was among the first scientists to inspect the medical effects of the atomic bomb in Nagasaki. Commander Greenblatt was honorably discharged in 1945.

He returned to MCG after World War II and from 1946 to 1974 he served as professor and chairman of the institution's Department of Endocrinology, the first academic department of its kind in the country.

Greenblatt started his clinical work in reproductive endocrinology, the branch of medicine concerned with infertility in women, when the field was in its infancy. His major advances in the field include, in 1950, showing the effectiveness of estrogens in managing menopause symptoms and developing, in 1966, a monthly oral contraceptive pill, an accomplishment for which MCG received national attention. His group's discovery in 1961 that clomiphene citrate could induce ovulation was a breakthrough in reproductive biology, and clomiphene citrate is today the first choice in treating ovulatory disorders. He also showed that the drug Danazol was useful in the management of endometriosis and fibrocystic breast disease.

Greenblatt's published works include hundreds of full-length scientific articles. He also wrote or edited more than 20 books for a lay audience. His 1968 book Search the Scriptures: Modern Medicine and Biblical Personages went through 26 printings. Greenblatt also updated "Advances in Endocrinology" in the Encyclopædia Britannica Yearbook for 18 years. In 1987, he authored Sex and Circumstance: Humanity in History, which contained 44 vignettes detailing the sexual nature of people ranging from U.S. President John F. Kennedy to Pyotr Ilyich Tchaikovsky.

Honors
Greenblatt was awarded the Crawford W. Long Memorial Medal for his work on menometrorrhagia in 1941. He also received France's Legion of Honor, Chevalier de la Légion d'honneur, in 1973, and the Sociedad de Ginecologia y Obstetricia de Monterrey Gold Medal award of Mexico in 1974. In March 1987, he was elected honorary fellow in the Royal College of Obstetricians and Gynecologists in Great Britain. MCG's library was renamed in his honor in 1988.

Greenblatt died on September 27, 1987.

References

1906 births
1987 deaths
American obstetricians
20th-century Canadian physicians